James Harper Godman (October 19, 1808 – October 4, 1891) was a Republican politician in the U.S. State of Ohio who was a member of the Ohio House of Representatives and Ohio Senate, and was Ohio State Auditor for eight years, (1864–1872). He was also a Union Army soldier in the American Civil War.

James H. Godman was born in Berkeley County, Virginia (now West Virginia), and ultimately relocated to Marion, Ohio, where he was admitted to the bar in 1828.

In 1835, Godman was elected to represent Marion and Crawford Counties in the Ohio House of Representatives for the 34th General Assembly, and won again in 1839 for the 38th General Assembly. In 1840 and 1841, he won election to the Ohio Senate for the 39th and 40th General Assemblies.

Godman enlisted April 26, 1861 as a Major in the Union Army during the American Civil War in the 4th Ohio Infantry, promoted to lieutenant colonel January 9, 1862, and to colonel November 29, 1862. He was severely wounded at Fredericksburg and honorably discharged July 28, 1863. March 13, 1865 he received the rank brevet brigadier general. He was elected as a Republican for State Auditor in 1863, and re-elected in 1867, serving eight years.

While a resident of Marion, Godman help attract the first railroad through the town.  His family legacy also lives on withnthe establishment of Columbus, Ohio's Godman Guild, a settlement house.  The organization is today known as the Godman Guild Association.

Godman died October 4, 1891, and is buried at Marion Cemetery.

Notes

References

Ohio lawyers
People from Marion, Ohio
1808 births
1891 deaths
People of Ohio in the American Civil War
State Auditors of Ohio
Union Army colonels
Republican Party Ohio state senators
Republican Party members of the Ohio House of Representatives
19th-century American politicians
19th-century American lawyers